Chris Davis is a British singer and guitarist in Nottingham-based shoegaze band Spotlight Kid, as well as a drummer with Six By Seven.  
    
Davis has also stood in on drums for Spiritualized in 2002 when Kev Bales fell ill.

In 2009, Davis toured with Soulsavers and Mark Lanegan on the Depeche Mode European Tour.

References

External links
Spotlight Kid Official web site
Spotlight Kid on MySpace
Interview with Chris Davis 1999
www.sixbyseven.co.uk

Year of birth missing (living people)
Living people
English rock singers
English rock guitarists
English rock drummers
Musicians from Nottinghamshire